The Azerbaijan Soviet Socialist Republic, also referred to as the Azerbaijani Soviet Socialist Republic, Azerbaijan SSR, Azerbaijani SSR, AzSSR, AzbSSR, Soviet Azerbaijan or simply Azerbaijan was one of the constituent republics of the Soviet Union between 1922 and 1991. Created on 28 April 1920 when the Russian Soviet Federative Socialist Republic brought pro-Soviet figures to power in the region, the first two years of the Azerbaijani SSR were as an independent country until incorporation into the Transcausasian SFSR, along with the Armenian SSR and the Georgian SSR.

In December 1922, the Transcaucasian SFSR became part of the newly established Soviet Union. The Constitution of Azerbaijan SSR was approved by the 9th Extraordinary All-Azerbaijani Congress of Soviets on 14 March 1937. On 5 February 1991, Azerbaijan SSR was renamed the Republic of Azerbaijan according to the Decision No.16-XII of Supreme Soviet of Azerbaijan approving the Decree of the President of Azerbaijan SSR dated 29 November 1990, remained in the USSR for the period before the declaration of independence in August 1991. The Constitution of the Azerbaijan SSR ceased to exist in 1995, upon the adoption of the new Constitution of Azerbaijan.

Etymology
The name "Azerbaijan" originates as the "Land of Atropates", an Achaemenid then Hellenistic-era king over a region in present-day Iranian Azarbaijan and Iranian Kurdistan, south of the modern state. Despite this difference, the present name was chosen by the Musavat to replace the Russian names Transcaucasia and Baku in 1918. "Azerbaijan" derives from Persian Āzarbāydjān, from earlier Ādharbāyagān and Ādharbādhagān, from Middle Persian Āturpātākān, from Old Persian Atropatkan.

From its founding it was officially known as the Azerbaijan Socialist Soviet Republic. When the Transcaucasian Socialist Federative Soviet Republic was abolished, the name was changed to the Azerbaijan Soviet Socialist Republic according to the 1937 and 1978 Azerbaijan SSR constitutions. Upon independence, it was renamed to the Republic of Azerbaijan (or Azerbaijani Republic) in 1991. The current official name was retained after the new Constitution of Azerbaijan was adopted in 1995.

History

Establishment

The Azerbaijan SSR was established on 28 April 1920 after the surrender of the government of the Azerbaijan Democratic Republic to local Bolsheviks led by Mirza Davud Huseynov and Nariman Narimanov and the invasion of the Bolshevik 11th Red Army.

On 13 October 1921, the Soviet republics of Russia, Armenia, Azerbaijan, and Georgia signed an agreement with Turkey known as the Treaty of Kars. The previously independent Nakhcivan SSR would also become an autonomous ASSR within Azerbaijan by the Treaty of Kars.

Borders of Azerbaijan and Armenia, like elsewhere in the USSR, were redrawn several times, yet neither side was completely satisfied with the results.

Transcaucasian SFSR

On 12 March 1922 the leaders of Azerbaijan, Armenian, and Georgian Soviet Socialist Republics established a union known as the Transcaucasian Soviet Federal Socialist Republic (TSFSR). This was the first attempt at a union of Soviet republics, preceding the USSR. The Union Council of TSFSR consisted of the representatives of the three republics – Nariman Narimanov (Azerbaijan), Polikarp Mdivani (Georgia), and Aleksandr Fyodorovich Miasnikyan (Armenia). The First Secretary of the Transcaucasian Communist Party was Sergo Ordzhonikidze.

In December 1922 TSFSR agreed to join the union with Russia, Ukraine, and Belarus, thus creating the Union of Soviet Socialist Republics which would last until 1991. The TSFSR, however, did not last long. In December 1936, the Transcaucasian Union was dismantled when the leaders in the Union Council found themselves unable to come to agreement over several issues. Azerbaijan, Armenia, and Georgia then became union Republics of the Soviet Union directly.

Economy and development
In the spring of 1921, a general change-over from revkoms and kombeds to Soviets took place. In order to help the Azerbaijani oil industry the Supreme Council of the National Economy decided in the same year to provide it with everything necessary out of turn. The new oilfields, like Ilyich bay, Qaraçuxur, Lökbatan and Qala have been discovered. By 1929, a significant kolkhoz movement had developed and Azerbaijan became the second Soviet tea producer after the Georgian SSR for the first time. On 31 March 1931, the oil industry of the Azerbaijan SSR, which supplied over 60% of the total Soviet oil production at the time, was awarded the Order of Lenin. The republic gained the second Order on 15 March 1935 during the observation of its 15th anniversary. By the end of the second five-year plan (1933–1937) Azerbaijan had become the 3rd republic in the Soviet Union by its capital investment size.

World War II
During the period 17 September 1939 to 21 June 1941, Nazi Germany, due to its non-aggression pact and relatively normalized trade relations with the USSR, was a major importer of oil produced in the Azerbaijan Soviet Socialist Republic.

This changed when Germany invaded the Soviet Union on 22 June 1941. In the first year of the Soviet-German War, Azerbaijan produced 23.5 million tons of oil – a record for the entire history of its oil industry. By the end of 1941, thousands of Azerbaijanis had joined the People's Volunteer Corps. Mobilization affected all spheres of life, particularly the oil industries. A week after fighting began, the oil workers themselves took the initiative to extend their work to 12-hour shifts, with no days off, no holidays, and no vacations until the end of the war. Meanwhile, in September 1942 Hitler's generals presented him with a large decorated cake which depicted the Caspian Sea and Baku. Baku then became the primary strategic goal of Hitler's 1942 Fall Blau offensive. This offensive was unsuccessful, however. The German army reached the mountains of the Caucasus, but was at the same time decisively defeated at the Battle of Stalingrad and so forced to retreat from the area, abandoning all hopes for a Reichskommissariat Kaukasus. In 1942 Azerbaijan also became the second-largest tea producer of the Soviet Army. By the decree of the Supreme Soviet of the USSR in February 1942, the commitment of more than 500 workers and employees of the oil industry of Azerbaijan was awarded orders and medals. Of the estimated 600,000 Azerbaijanis who were recruited into the Soviet Army during the war, 290,000 died.

Post-war period

An event that greatly impacted Azerbaijanis on both sides of the border was the Soviet occupation of Iranian Azerbaijan in the summer of 1941. The Soviet military presence south of the Aras River led to a revival of Pan-Azerbaijani nationalism. During the Soviet occupation, a revival of the Azerbaijani literary language, which had largely been supplanted by Persian, was promoted with the help of writers, journalists, and teachers from Soviet Azerbaijan. In November 1945, with Soviet backing, an autonomous "Azerbaijan People's Government" was set up at Tabriz under Jafar Pishevari, the leader of the Azerbaijani Democratic Party. Secular cultural institutions and education in Azerbaijani blossomed throughout Iranian Azerbaijan, and speculation grew rife about a possible unification of the two Azerbaijani republics, under Soviet control. As it turned out, the issue of Iranian Azerbaijan became one of the first conflicts of the Cold War, and under the pressure from the Western powers, the Soviet army was withdrawn. The Iranian government regained control over Iranian Azerbaijan by the end of 1946 and the Democratic Party leaders took refuge in Soviet Azerbaijan. Jafar Pishevari, who was never fully trusted by Stalin, soon died under mysterious circumstances.

Apart from the Oil Rocks, Azerbaijan's first offshore oil field was opened in the early 1950s. Policies of de-Stalinization and improvement after the 1950s led to better education and welfare conditions for most of Azerbaijan. This also coincided with the period of rapid urbanization and industrialization. During this period of change, a new anti-Islamic drive and return to a policy of Russification, under the policy of sblizheniye (rapprochement), was instituted in order to merge all the peoples of the USSR into a new monolithic Soviet nation.

Pre-secession
In the 1960s, signs of a structural crisis in the Soviet system began to emerge. Azerbaijan's crucial oil industry lost its relative importance in the Soviet economy, partly because of a shift of oil production to other regions of the Soviet Union and partly because of the depletion of known oil resources accessible from land, while offshore production was not deemed cost-effective. As a result, Azerbaijan had the lowest rate of growth in productivity and economic output among the Soviet republics, with the exception of Tajikistan. Ethnic tensions, particularly between Armenians and Azerbaijanis began to grow, but the violence was suppressed. In an attempt to end the growing structural crisis, the government in Moscow appointed Heydar Aliyev as the first secretary of the Communist Party of Azerbaijan in 1969. Aliyev temporarily improved the economic conditions and promoted alternative industries to the declining oil industry, such as cotton. He also consolidated the republic's ruling elite, which now consisted almost entirely of ethnic Azerbaijanis, thus reverting the previous trends of sblizheniye. In 1982 Aliyev was made a member of the Communist Party's Politburo in Moscow. In 1987, when Perestroika was implemented, he was forced to retire by Soviet leader Mikhail Gorbachev, whose reform policies he opposed.

Secession
The late 1980s, during the Gorbachev era, were characterized by increasing unrest in the Caucasus, initially over the Nagorno-Karabakh issue. The ethnic strife revealed the shortcomings of the Communist Party as a champion of national interests and, in the spirit of glasnost, independent publications and political organizations began to emerge. Of these organizations, by far the most prominent was the Popular Front of Azerbaijan (PFA), which by the fall of 1989 had a lot of popular support. The movement supported independence from the USSR.

Unrest culminated with a crackdown by the Red army which aimed at silencing the demands for independence. At least 132 demonstrators were killed and other civilians in Baku injured on 20 January 1990.

Azerbaijan participated in the union-wide referendum to preserve the union as the Union of Soviet Sovereign Republics but with different constitutional arrangements. The referendum was passed by 93.3% of valid polls. The Armenian SSR did not participate in the referendum. The Supreme Soviet of the exclave of the Nakhichevan Autonomous Soviet Socialist Republic also decided not to participate in the referendum. The Azerbaijani Popular Front Party argued that only 15% of the electorate had participated in the referendum.

The "Treaty of the Union of Sovereign States” failed to be ratified because the 1991 Soviet coup d'état attempt accelerated declarations of independence by Soviet Socialist Republics between August and December. Azerbaijan adopted its declaration of independence on 30 August 1991. The final dissolution of the Soviet Union took place on 26 December 1991. Shortly before that date, the Azerbaijan SSR joined the Commonwealth of Independent States.

By the end of 1991 fighting in Nagorno-Karabakh had escalated into a full-scale war, which culminated into a tense 1994 cease-fire that has persisted into the 21st century. Although a cease-fire was achieved, several escalations over the years such as in 2016 and in 2020 had resulted in large-scale military confrontations.

Government 
On 28 April 1920, Temporary Revolutionary Committee took control over the country, and formed a government named Council of People's Commissars of Azerbaijan SSR.

After the approval of the Constitution of Azerbaijan SSR by the All-Azerbaijan Congress of Soviets in 1921, Azerbaijan Revolutionary Committee was revoked and Central Executive Committee was selected as a supreme legislative body.

According to the Constitution Azerbaijan SSR in 1937, the legislative body switched to a new phase. Central Executive Committee was replaced with Supreme Soviet.

Heads of state
Sergey Kirov (1921-1926)
Levon Mirzoyan (1926-1929)
Ruhulla Akhundov (1925-1926)
Mir Jafar Baghirov (1933-1953)
Imam Mustafayev (1954-1959)
Veli Akhundov (1959-1969)
Heydar Aliyev (1969-1982)
Kamran Baghirov (1982-1988)
Abdurrahman Vazirov (1988-1990)
Ayaz Mutallibov (1990-1991)

Chairmen of the Central Executive Committee
Mukhtar Gajiyev (1921–1922)
Samed Aliyev (1922–1929)
Gazanfar Musabekov (1929–1931)
Sultan Medjid Efendiev (1932–1937)
Mir Bashir Gasimov (1937–1938)

Chairmen of the Presidium of the Supreme Soviet
Mir Bashir Gasimov (1938–1949)
Nazar Geydarov (1949–1954)
Mirza Ibrahimov (1954–1958)
Ilyas Abdullayev (1958–1959)
Saftar Jafarov (1959–1961)
Mamed Iskenderov (1961–1969)
Gurban Khalilov (1969–1985)
Suleyman Tatliyev (1985-1989)
Elmira Gafarova (1989–1990)

President of the Azerbaijan Soviet Socialist Republic
Ayaz Mutallibov (1990–1991)

Military

Under the military structure of the former Soviet Union, Azerbaijan shortly before gaining independence, was host to over 60,000 Soviet military personnel deployed throughout the country in units of the Ground Forces, Air Forces, Air Defense Forces, and Navy. The primary combat formation of Ground Forces in Azerbaijan was the 4th Army, which housed its headquarters and various support units in Baku. In addition to the independent surface-to-air missile (SAM), artillery, and SCUD brigades, the principal combat elements of the Fourth Army were the 23rd (Ganja), 295th (Lenkaran), 60th (Baku) and 75th (Nakhchivan) motorized rifle divisions (MRD), and the Ganja Helicopter Assault Regiment (Mi-24 Hinds and Mi-8 Hips). The only ground forces training establishment in Azerbaijan was the Baku Higher Combined Arms Command School. Military conscription in the Azerbaijan SSR was introduced only after the establishment of Soviet control, with the number of people being called up for service being minimal at first.

Notes

References

Further reading 
История государства и права Азербайджанской ССР. Б., Академия наук ССР, 1964.
Гражданский кодекс Азербайджанской ССР. Б., Верховный совет, 1964.
Madatov, G. Azerbaijan During the Great Patriotic War. Baku, 1975.
Независимая газета, 12 August 1992, pp. 1–2.

External links 

Всесоюзная перепись населения 1989 г. Численность населения союзных республик СССР и их территориальных единиц по полу
Справочник по истории Коммунистической партии и Советского Союза 1898 – 1965
Сталинские списки: Азербайджанская ССР 
Azerbaijan: A Land in Bloom by Mamed Iskenderov
Azerbaijan: Azerbaijan has become a member of the International Organization of Vine and Wine (OIV)
Ismailov, Eldar: "1937: "Great Terror" in Azerbaijan" in the Caucasus Analytical Digest No. 22

 
1920 establishments in Azerbaijan
1922 disestablishments in Azerbaijan
Communism in Azerbaijan
Former socialist republics
Republics of the Soviet Union
States and territories established in 1920
States and territories disestablished in 1922
1936 establishments in Azerbaijan
1991 disestablishments in the Soviet Union
States and territories established in 1936
States and territories disestablished in 1991
1991 disestablishments in Azerbaijan